Serhiy Anatoliyovych Zayets (born 18 August 1969) is a Ukrainian professional football coach and a former player.

Club career
He made his professional debut in the Soviet Top League in 1989 for FC Dynamo Kyiv.

In 2017, he was named the manager for FC Vorkuta in the Canadian Soccer League. In his debut season he secured the regular season title.

Honours
 UEFA European Under-21 Championship champion: 1990
 Soviet Top League champion: 1990.
 Soviet Top League bronze: 1989.
 Soviet Cup winner: 1990.
 Ukrainian Premier League champion: 1993.
 Ukrainian Premier League runner-up: 1992.
 Ukrainian Cup winner: 1993.

European club competitions
With FC Dynamo Kyiv.

 UEFA Cup 1989–90: 6 games, 1 goal.
 European Cup Winners' Cup 1990–91: 3 games, 1 goal.
 European Cup 1991–92: 9 games.

References

1969 births
Living people
People from Berdychiv
Soviet footballers
Ukrainian footballers
Soviet Union under-21 international footballers
FC Dynamo Kyiv players
FC Ural Yekaterinburg players
Soviet Top League players
Russian Premier League players
Ukrainian Premier League players
FC Nyva Vinnytsia players
Ukrainian expatriate footballers
Expatriate footballers in Russia
Association football defenders
Ukrainian football managers
Canadian Soccer League (1998–present) managers
Ukrainian expatriate sportspeople in Russia
Ukrainian expatriate sportspeople in Canada
Expatriate soccer managers in Canada
Ukrainian expatriate football managers
Sportspeople from Zhytomyr Oblast